Seoul Metropolitan City Route 50 is an urban road located in Seoul, South Korea.

Stopovers

 Seoul
 Eunpyeong District - Seodaemun District - Mapo District - Seodaemun - Jongno District - Dongdaemun District - Gwangjin District - Gangdong District
 Gyeonggi Province
 Hanam
 Seoul
 Gangdong District

List of Facilities 
IS: Intersection, IC: Interchange

References

Roads in Gyeonggi
Roads in Seoul